also known as "CANDYMAN" is a master Amezaiku or candy sculpture artist.
As a party and event entertainer, he specializes in sculpting hot taffy-like candy into fantastic animals and objects using a palette of gemstone inspired candy colors. This traditional ancient Japanese folk art that originated in China has been practiced for over a 1000 years in Japan.

Through a  thirty-year career, Ichiyanagi has become known internationally as a live performance artist.

His big fans call him as a ”Shan The Candyman", "Shan The Candy Sculptor",
"Shan The Candy Artist" and more.

In addition to his Amezaiku career, Ichiyanagi is a Graduate Gemologist G.G. - jewelry designer and a karate Instructor, holding Black Belts in three styles, Shorinji Kempo - Shotekan Karate - Shinkendo.

Early life 

Ichiyanagai was born in the city of Sapporo, Hokkaido Prefecture, Hokkaido Island; the second of three sons and one sister of Miyako and Osamu Ichiyanagi.  He   moved to Los Angeles in the  U.S. a month after graduating in 1971 from Sapporo Kosei High School at the age of 18. to live with his one relative, Kazuko and John Smith (sponsors), in. This was the beginning of Ichiyangi’s own personal cultural exchange with America.

Careers 

By the age of 16, in Japan, Ichiyanagi earned a black belt in Shorinji Kempo.

While attending college, Ichiyanagi teamed up with Benny Urquidez to travel together for 2 years in the Los Angeles area, demonstrating martial arts skills to young college students and eventually to private lessons. As a head instructor under Hiroyasu Fujishima, he  taught Karate at Los Angeles Valley College, California State University Northridge (CSUN) Karate Club and the California Karate Association (defunct), directly affiliated with Japan Karate Association (JKA). During his first years in America, Ichiyanagi continued his formal educational studies at night for English language while attending Los Angeles Valley College (LAVC) and as a business major attending California State University Northridge.

During class time at adult school, Ichiyanagi met the acquaintance and friendship of Amezaiku Master Masagi Terasawa, a fellow Japanese expatriate Master Terasawa accepted Ichiyanagi as a personal student, and Ichiyanagi had a 3-year apprenticeship between 1973 and 1976.

From 1976 to the present date, Ichiyanagi has performed Amezaiku for thousands of events and private parties in the United States and Internationally. A modern prologue including the AM² convention in 2011, as well as with private events.

Jewelry design 

Ichiyangi transitioned his work ethic into the field of   Gemology, in 1980 with his graduation from GIA.  For three decades he has paralleled his Amezaiku work 
with professional work  in the jewelry industry.

Professional History 

Karate - Black Belt

  1968, Shorinjikempo, Sapporo, Japan
  1972, Shotokan Karate, Los Angeles, California
  1973, Instructor Japanese Karate Association, Los Angeles, California
  1991, Shinkendo, Los Angeles, California

Amezaiku Shokunin

  1973,  Student of Master Masagi Terasawa
  1976,  First Professional Amezaiku private & public event performances
  1976 to date,  Professional performances, corporate events, public exhibitions, charitable events, private parties.

Gemologist - Jewelry Design

 1980, Graduate Gemologist, Gemological Institute of America
 1982  Jewelry Business & Services - Jewelry Design
 2010  CAD Design 
 2012  Jewelry website, www.sugilite.jp

References

External links 
   personal web site

1952 births
Living people
Gemologists
Japanese artists
Karate coaches
Japanese male karateka